Eruvin (lit. In this sense this tractate is a natural extension of Shabbat; at one point these tractates were likely joined but then split due to length.

Eruvin, along with Niddah and Yevamot, is considered one of the three most difficult tractates in the Babylonian Talmud. A Hebrew mnemonic for the three is עני (ani, meaning "poverty").

Structure
The tractate consists of ten chapters with a total of 96 mishnayot. Its Babylonian Talmud version is of 105 pages and its Jerusalem Talmud version is of 65 pages.

An overview of the content of chapters is as follows:

 Chapter 1 has ten mishnayot.
 Chapter 2 has six mishnayot.
 Chapter 3 has nine mishnayot.
 Chapter 4 has eleven mishnayot.
 Chapter 5 has nine mishnayot.
 Chapter 6 has ten mishnayot.
 Chapter 7 has eleven mishnayot.
 Chapter 8 has eleven mishnayot.
 Chapter 9 has four mishnayot.
 Chapter 10 has fifteen mishnayot.

Main subjects

Eruv Chatzeirot

An eruv (Hebrew: עירוב, "mixture"), also transliterated as eiruv or erub, plural: eruvin [ʔeʁuˈvin]) is a ritual enclosure that permits Jewish residents or visitors to carry certain objects outside their own homes on Sabbath and Yom Kippur (the Day of Atonement). An eruv accomplishes this by integrating a number of private and public properties into one larger private domain, thereby countermanding restrictions on carrying objects from the private to the public domain on Sabbath and holidays.

The eruv allows these religious Jews to, among other things, carry house keys, tissues, medicines, or babies with them, and use strollers and canes. Orthodox Judaism prohibits motorized transportation on Shabbat and holidays, although the presence of an eruv for carrying permits certain types of non-motorized transport such as strollers and wheelchairs. The presence or absence of an eruv thus especially affects the lives of people with limited mobility and those responsible for taking care of babies and young children.

Eruv techumin

An eruv techumin (Hebrew: עירוב תחומין "mixed borders") for traveling enables a traditionally observant Jew to travel on Shabbat or a Jewish holiday. The Jew prepares food prior to Shabbat or a holiday at a location to which they plan to travel that is farther than is normally allowed on such days.

Eruv tavshilin
An eruv tavshilin (Hebrew: עירוב תבשילין "mixed cooked food items") is made in the home on the eve of a holiday with a work proscription that directly precedes the Sabbath.  It is made by taking a cooked item and a baked item, and placing them together.  It is common to use a piece of cooked egg, fish, or meat as the cooked item and a piece of bread or matzah as the baked item.  It is needed because while it is allowed to cook and transfer fire on holidays (unlike the Sabbath and Yom Kippur, when these activities are forbidden), these activities are allowed to be done for use on only the holiday, and not for the next day.  The eruv tavshilin makes it possible to begin preparing for the Sabbath before the holiday, and continue doing so.  The foods of the eruv tavshilin are traditionally eaten on the Sabbath day following the holiday.

External links

 Tractate Eiruvin

References

Oral Torah
Talmud
Eruvin